Tomaž Stopajnik (born 14 January 2001) is a Slovenian professional footballer who plays as a goalkeeper for Primera División RFEF side Alcoyano.

Club career
In February 2019, Stopajnik made his professional debut in the Slovenian PrvaLiga for Rudar Velenje in a 6–2 loss to Domžale. In July 2021, he joined Primera División RFEF side Alcoyano on a free transfer.

International career
Stopajnik represented Slovenia at under-19 in two friendlies in 2019.

References

External links

2001 births
Living people
Sportspeople from Maribor
Slovenian footballers
Association football goalkeepers
Slovenia youth international footballers
Slovenian PrvaLiga players
Slovenian Second League players
NK Maribor players
NK Rudar Velenje players
CD Alcoyano footballers
Slovenian expatriate footballers
Slovenian expatriate sportspeople in Spain
Expatriate footballers in Spain